Udi may refer to:

Places
 Udi, Enugu, a local government areas and city in Nigeria
 Udi, a place in the Etawah district of Uttar Pradesh, India

People
 Udi Gal (born 1979), Israeli Olympic sailor
 Udi Vaks (born 1979), Israeli Olympic judoka

Other uses
 Udi people of the Caucasus
 Udi language of the Caucasus
 Udi’s Healthy Foods, a brand of products by Boulder Brands

See also
 UDI (disambiguation)
 Daybreak in Udi, a 1949 documentary film and winner of an Academy Award for Best Documentary Feature

Language and nationality disambiguation pages

fr:Udi